At Risk is a 1988 book by Alice Hoffman about Amanda, an 11-year-old girl who contracts AIDS from a blood transfusion.

Characters 

Amanda Farrell
Polly - Amanda's mother
Ivan - Amanda's father
Charlie - Amanda's brother
Jessie Eagan - Amanda's best friend
Sevrin - Charlie's best friend
Laurel Smith - medium, friend to Amamda
Linda Gleason - Principal of the Cheshire School

Plot 
Amanda lives with a typical suburban family in the town of Morrow, Massachusetts until she comes down with a fever and a blood test for AIDS returns as positive. She contracted it from an unscreened blood transfusion during surgery, 5 years before. Her world is turned upside down. As the news spreads, other parents, fearful of their own children catching it, cut off contact with the family. Fear spreads among her peers, who are uneducated as to the nature of sex and believe that AIDS can be spread by skin contact or using the same toilet seat. Her principal decides to counter this by giving the whole school a class-by-class sex-ed talk. Amanda eventually becomes weaker and weaker, having to give up gymnastics, because of this and because of parental fears that using the same equipment could spread the virus to her teammates. Amanda becomes bitter and disillusioned, becoming friends with Laurel, a medium. She decides to have her braces removed, and her father locates a pediatric orthodontist who will see an AIDS patient. While Amanda's death is portrayed to be inevitable, the novel concludes with an open ending - the special friendship between Charlie and Sevrin. Perhaps this is a more encouraging ending that symbolises hope and the eternal aspect of love.

Setting 
This book is set in the contemporary 1980s, a time when little was publicly known about AIDS or how it was spread.

Reaction

The novel was controversial when published, and was referred to as "that AIDS novel" in publishing circles.

The film rights were immediately acquired by 20th Century Fox and was a Main Selection of the Book of the Month Club.

Reviews were positive.

References

External links 

1988 American novels
HIV/AIDS in literature
Novels set in Massachusetts
G. P. Putnam's Sons books